The men's 4 x 100 metre relay at the 2007 World Championships in Athletics was held at the Nagai Stadium on 31 August and 1 September.

Medalists

* Runners who participated in the heats only and received medals.

Records
Prior to the competition, the following records were as follows.

Schedule

Results

Heats
The first 2 of each heat (Q) plus the 2 fastest times (q) qualify.

Final

References
IAAF results, heats
IAAF results, final

Relay 4x100
Relays at the World Athletics Championships